The 1963 LPGA Championship was the ninth LPGA Championship, held October 10–13 at Stardust Country Club in Las Vegas, Nevada.

After a second round 82 (+11), Mickey Wright shot 70 (−1) in both of the final two rounds to win her fourth and final LPGA Championship, two strokes ahead of runners-up Mary Lena Faulk, Mary Mills, and Louise Suggs. Defending champion Judy Kimball finished six strokes back, in a tie for ninth place. It was Wright's second major title of the year and the eleventh of her thirteen career majors. It was her thirteenth tour victory of the 1963 season.

It was the third of six consecutive LPGA Championships at Stardust, which opened two years earlier. After several ownership and name changes, it became Las Vegas National Golf Club in 1998.

Past champions in the field

Source:

Final leaderboard
Sunday, October 13, 1963

Source:

References

External links
Golf Stats  leaderboard
Las Vegas National Golf Club 

Women's PGA Championship
Golf in Las Vegas
LPGA Championship
LPGA Championship
LPGA Championship
LPGA Championship
Women's sports in Nevada